Shree Ashtavinayak Cine Vision Limited was a film production and distribution company that produced and distributed Hindi films. The chief of the company was Dhillin Mehta.

Television
Ashtavinayak Cine Vision produced the serial Aamrapali (TV serial) on Doordarshan in 2002.

Company Information
The company management includes the following people :-

Dhilin Mehta - Chairman & Managing Director
S.S Jaswal - Director
Rupen N. Amlani, Dhaval V. Jatania, Hiren J. Gandhi - Full Time Directors
Ashok V. Ladhani, Chandrakant K. Sachde, Nishant A. Mahidhar, Hetal N. Thakore - Independent Non-Executive Directors

It is listed on the BSE with a BSE Code of 532793 and the NSE with an NSE Code of SHREEASHTA.

Its Registered office is at A-204/205, VIP Plaza, 2nd Floor, Off Andheri Malad Link Road, Mumbai, Maharashtra - 400053.

Initial Years (2003-04)
The company entered Bollywood with Fun2shh... Dudes in the 10th Century (2003), which marked its first of many collaborations with music composers Pritam and duo Salim–Sulaiman, and actor Paresh Rawal. Next, it produced Agnipankh (2004), a film on pilots in the Indian Air Force, where Pritam and Salim–Sulaiman teamed up again to compose the music.

Early Success (2005-06)
The company's first big hit came with David Dhawan's comedy Maine Pyaar Kyun Kiya (2005), which starred Salman Khan, Sushmita Sen, the film's producer Sohail Khan, Katrina Kaif, Arshad Warsi and Isha Koppikar.

The next year, more prominence came in for the company as it produced the comedies Golmaal: Fun Unlimited (2006) and Bhagam Bhag (2006). While the former marked its first major collaboration with Ajay Devgn and Tusshar Kapoor as well as director Rohit Shetty, the latter was one of the company's first of many collaborations with Akshay Kumar. Both films had Rawal in prominent roles.

Jab We Met (2007)
The company produced Jab We Met, directed by Imtiaz Ali and starring Shahid Kapoor and Kareena Kapoor. It was released on 26 October 2007. The film was nominated for a number of awards, and received the Stardust Award for Best Film in 2008.

2008-present
In early 2008, the company produced Superstar starring Kunal Khemu. Late into the year, the company saw success with the hit Golmaal Returns, the sequel to Golmaal, whilst also producing Kidnap. At the end of the year the company released Maharathi starring Boman Irani, Neha Dhupia, Ashwin Nayak, Om Puri, Paresh Rawal, Naseeruddin Shah and Tara Sharma. With the exception of Golmaal Returns, none of the films was successful at the box office.

Blue was Shree Ashtavinayak's biggest project till date with its budget set to INR 100 crores. It was an action film shot in the Bahamas and starring Sanjay Dutt, Akshay Kumar, Lara Dutta and Zayed Khan. However, the film performed poorly at the box office, and got predominantly negative reviews. It also released Luck with a negative result as it earned even less than Kidnap.

Dabangg, Shree Ashtavinayak's most commercial release performed very well at the box office, with its first day collection surpassing that of 3 Idiots, which was distributed by Big Pictures. Dabangg is one of biggest hits of Bollywood. 2010 also earned the company some acclaim and success with the comedies Khatta Meetha and Golmaal 3, which were successful.

Shree Ashtavinayak Cine vision entered into Joint Venture with LFS Global for creating India's largest film city near Mumbai. In 2011, it produced the iconic Rockstar, also directed by Ali. As the company faced judicial crisis, it halted operations after producing its final film, the 2012 comedy Bol Bachchan, also directed by Shetty.

However, on 20 June 2014, the company was suspended from trading. Additionally, the Bombay High Court assigned a liquidator after the company failed to pay its creditors. Later, it had to sell the rights of the Golmaal franchise to Shetty, who became a producer in 2014.

Some time later, in 2017–18, when Zee Entertainment Enterprises was rechristened with a new logo, theme and slogans, it syndicated the company's pre-2008 releases, and began broadcasting them on its channels, the only three exceptions being Fun2shh, Agnipankh and Maine Pyaar Kyun Kiya which were readily acquired by Viacom18. Films from 2008 onwards, with the exception of Bol Bachchan, lying with Disney Star, Luck, lying with Sony Pictures Networks India, and Khatta Meetha, Rockstar and Golmaal Returns, lying with Zee, have all been acquired by Viacom18. Among these, both of the company's most successful releases in 2010, Dabangg and Golmaal 3, lie jointly with Disney Star and Viacom18.

Films produced

References

External links
 Shree Ashtavinayak at IMDb
   at Moneycontrol.com

Film production companies based in Mumbai
Hindi cinema
Film distributors of India
Mass media companies established in 2001
Companies listed on the Bombay Stock Exchange